Robert Pike may refer to:

 Robert Pike (settler) (1616–1706), opponent to the Salem witchcraft prosecutions of 1692
 Robert Pike (bishop) (1905–1973), Bishop of Meath, 1959–1973
 Robert L. Pike (1912–1981), pseudonym of Robert L. Fish, American writer of crime fiction
 Bob Pike (politician) (1933–1994), Australian politician
 Bob Pike (surfer) (1940–1999), Australian surfer
 Rob Pike (born 1956), Canadian software engineer and author
 Rob Pike (athlete) (born 1970), Canadian pole vaulter